The 1965–66 Scottish Inter-District Championship was a rugby union competition for Scotland's district teams.

This season saw the 13th Scottish Inter-District Championship.

South won the competition with 3 wins.

1965-66 League Table

Results

Round 1

South: 

Glasgow District:

Round 2

 North and Midlands: 

South:

Round 3

Edinburgh District:

North and Midlands:

Round 4

Glasgow District: 

Edinburgh District:

Round 5

South: 

Edinburgh District:

Round 6

North and Midlands: 

Glasgow District:

References

1965–66 in Scottish rugby union
Scottish Inter-District Championship seasons